Oncofertility is a subfield that bridges oncology and reproductive research to explore and expand options for the reproductive future of cancer survivors.  The name was coined in 2006 by Teresa K. Woodruff at the Oncofertility Consortium.  

Cancer treatments, such as chemotherapy, radiation, and surgery, may destroy a person's ability to have children later in life, and oncofertility research focuses on increasing fertility preservation options. With 10% of cancer patients being younger than age 40, this issue affects more than 135,000 people in the United States each year. As cancer survivorship increases, the preservation of fertility in women, men, and children becomes a critically important topic to patients and their families. The ability to easily preserve fertility prior to cancer treatment can provide hope at the time of diagnosis for families later in life. Oncofertility also incorporates reproductive issues after cancer treatment, such as family planning, complex contraception, hormonal management throughout survivorship, surrogacy, and adoption.

Fertility options for men

Established fertility preservation options for men include sperm banking, in which a semen sample is produced, frozen, and stored for future use, and testicular sperm extraction, during which sperm is retrieved directly from the testes through a short surgical procedure and frozen. 

Experimental options include testicular tissue banking when testicular tissue is surgically removed and frozen. Scientists are developing methods to use this tissue for fertility preservation in males. 

Men who do not preserve their fertility prior to cancer treatment may have children through donor sperm using sperm from a known or anonymous donor to achieve a pregnancy with a female partner using assisted reproductive technologies or Adoption by permanently assuming all rights and responsibilities of a child through a legal process.

Fertility options for women

Options for women to have children after cancer have increased significantly in recent years. Women should be counseled on established options such as embryo banking in which hormonal stimulation causes the production of multiple eggs, which are removed, fertilized by sperm, and frozen for future use, and egg banking in which hormonal stimulation causes the production of multiple eggs, which are removed and frozen for storage and future use, and ovarian transposition (surgically moving the ovaries to a different part of the body) and ovarian shielding (physically shielding the ovaries from the area receiving radiation). 

Experimental techniques include ovarian tissue banking in which an ovary is surgically removed and frozen to be transplanted back into the woman when she is ready to have children. Scientists are also working on ways to mature undeveloped eggs from this ovarian tissue. 

After sterilizing cancer treatment, a woman can also choose surrogacy (when a woman carries a pregnancy for another woman or couple) or adoption. 

Recent efforts also investigate the implications of a cancer diagnosis during pregnancy.

Fertility options for children

Prepubescent children have fewer options to preserve fertility than adults. These include testicular sperm extraction for males and ovarian tissue banking for females.

Financial, ethical, and legal considerations
Fertility preservation costs may be prohibitive for young patients and multiple organizations now provide methods to reduce costs for patients. These include Fertile Hope and Fertile Action. 

The Supreme Court of the United States addressed the Social Security implications of oncofertility in March 2012 with Astrue v. Capato.

Research also investigates ethical issues in oncofertility, such as the decision-making process for adolescent children and their families.

References 

Fertility medicine
Oncology